Alf Martin Rekstad (born 28 September 1951 in Bogen, Evenes) is a Norwegian speed skater. He represented the club Ask Skøyteklubb. He competed in the 10,000 m at the 1980 Winter Olympics.

References

External links

1951 births
Living people
People from Evenes
Norwegian male speed skaters
Olympic speed skaters of Norway
Speed skaters at the 1980 Winter Olympics
Sportspeople from Nordland